Volleyball events were contested at the 1946 Central American and Caribbean Games in Barranquilla, Colombia.

References
  (PDF) 

1946 Central American and Caribbean Games
1946
1946 in volleyball
International volleyball competitions hosted by Colombia